Ernie McCoy may refer to:

Ernie McCoy (racing driver) (1921–2001), American racecar driver
Ernie McCoy (athletic director) (1904–1980), American collegiate athletic director